The Angolan giant blind snake (Afrotyphlops anomalus), also known as the anomalous beaked blind snake, is a species of snake in the Typhlopidae family. It is endemic to Angola. Its classification was changed from Rhinotyphlops to Megatyphlops when Rhinotyphlops was found to be polyphyletic. In 2014 Megatyphlops was changed to Afrotyphlops.

Geographic range
It is found in southeastern Angola.

References

Further reading
 Bocage, J.V.B. 1873. Reptiles nouveaux de l'intérieur de Mossamedes. Jornal de Sciencias Mathematicas Physicas e Naturaes. Academia Real das Sciencias de Lisboa, Volume 4, Number XV., pp. 247–253.
 

Afrotyphlops
Snakes of Africa
Reptiles of Angola
Endemic fauna of Angola
Reptiles described in 1873
Taxa named by José Vicente Barbosa du Bocage